Carboxycyclophosphamide is an inactive metabolite of the cytotoxic antineoplastic drug cyclophosphamide. In the metabolic pathway of cyclophosphamide inactivation it first metabolizes to 4-hydroxycyclophosphamide, then partially tautomerizes into aldophosphamide. Aldophosphamide then, in turn, is oxidized into carboxycyclophosphamide by the enzyme ALDH (aldehyde dehydrogenase).

References 

Human drug metabolites
Nitrogen mustards
Phosphorodiamidates
Chloroethyl compounds